The 2022 TCR Asia Series season was the seventh season of the TCR Asia Series.

Race Calendar 
The provisional 2022 schedule was announced on 18 December 2018, with seven events scheduled. However, After multiple postponements due to the current COVID restrictions in China. The final revised calendar was announced on 4 July 2022, with six events scheduled. Before November, the calendar was revised:

Teams and Drivers

Results and standings

Season summary

Drivers' standings 

 Scoring system

References

External links 
 

TCR Asia Series
Asia Series